Bernard Leopold Sandow Prendergast (25 December 1911 – 30 October 1966) was a Jamaican track and field athlete who competed for Great Britain in the 1936 Summer Olympics at Berlin, as Jamaica was not represented at that Olympics.

Prendergast participated in the discus throw event at the 1936 Berlin Olympics, but did not qualify for the final, and his exact result is unknown. He previously won the bronze medal in the discus throw competition, at the 1934 British Empire Games.

Born in Kingston, Jamaica, Prendergast was of British descent.  He studied medicine in London, at St Mary's Hospital Medical School, from 1933-42.  While at the Berlin Olympics in 1936, he was involved in an accident involving a javelin that caused a fatality, which had a profound effect on him.

References

External links
 

1911 births
1966 deaths
Sportspeople from Kingston, Jamaica
British male discus throwers
Jamaican male discus throwers
Olympic athletes of Great Britain
Athletes (track and field) at the 1936 Summer Olympics
Commonwealth Games bronze medallists for Jamaica
Commonwealth Games medallists in athletics
Athletes (track and field) at the 1934 British Empire Games
Jamaican people of British descent
Medallists at the 1934 British Empire Games